William Henry Cammeyer  (March 20, 1821 – September 4, 1898) was a businessman who was a pioneer in the early days of Major League Baseball. He was the owner of the New York Mutuals franchise and even managed the team during the 1876 season. He also built the Union Grounds ballpark  for the Mutuals.

Cammeyer was born in New York City, but he moved to Williamsburg, Brooklyn in 1849. His father was a leather merchant, and upon his father's death, Cammeyer inherited his father's business. It was the profits from this enterprise which enabled him to finance the construction of the Union Grounds in 1861.

Cammeyer died in his home, located at 44 Macon Street in Brooklyn. He was survived by his wife, four daughters, and three sons.

External links
Baseball Reference Managerial record
Findagrave entry

References

Major League Baseball managers
Major League Baseball executives
1821 births
1898 deaths
People from Williamsburg, Brooklyn
19th-century American businesspeople